In aviation, propeller synchronization is a mechanism that automatically synchronizes all propellers of a multi-engine, propeller-driven aircraft so that they rotate at the same speed.

Propeller synchronization serves mainly to increase the comfort of crew and passengers, since its primary purpose is to reduce the “beats” generated by propellers that are turning at slightly different speeds.  These beats can become very irritating to persons inside the aircraft after a time.  Synchronization is not normally necessary for proper operation of the aircraft.

Some aircraft provide a visual indicator of propeller synchronization in the cockpit.  Pilots can use this indicator to decide whether or not to engage propeller synchronization, or to help them synchronize propeller speeds manually.

Synchronizer function

Many multiengine airplanes have a propeller synchronizer (prop sync) installed to eliminate the annoying “drumming” or “beat” of propellers whose rotation speed are close, but not precisely the same. To use prop sync, the propeller r.p.m. are coarsely matched by the pilot and the system is engaged. The prop sync adjusts the r.p.m. of the “secondary” engine to precisely match the r.p.m. of the “primary” engine, and then maintains that relationship. The prop sync should be disengaged when the pilot selects a new propeller r.p.m., then re-engaged after the new r.p.m. is set. The prop sync should always be off for takeoff, landing, and single-engine operation. The AFM/POH should be consulted for system description and limitations.

Propeller synchrophaser

A variation on the propeller synchronizer is the propeller synchrophaser. Prop sychrophase acts much like a synchronizer to precisely match r.p.m., but the synchrophaser goes one step further. It not only matches r.p.m. but actually compares and adjusts the positions of the individual blades of the propellers in their arcs. There can be significant propeller noise and vibration reductions with a propeller synchrophaser. From the pilot’s perspective, operation of a propeller synchronizer and a propeller syncrophaser are very similar. A synchrophaser is also commonly referred to as prop sync, although that is not entirely correct nomenclature from a technical standpoint.

Usage

As a pilot aid to manually synchronizing the propellers, some twins have a small gauge called a synchroscope mounted in or by the tachometer(s) with a propeller symbol on a disk that spins. The pilot manually fine tunes the engine r.p.m. so as to stop disk rotation, thereby synchronizing the propellers. This is a useful backup to synchronizing engine r.p.m. using the audible propeller beat. This gauge is also found installed with most propeller synchronizer and synchrophase systems. Some synchrophase systems use a knob for the pilot to control the phase angle.

Operation of propeller synchronization can occur with a master/slave approach or with a push/pull technique associated with Type II systems.  In Type II systems speed is increased for the side lower in RPM while at the same time speed is decreased on the faster RPM side. The net result is similar, but there is no master or slave, and no minute hunting typical of a Type I (primary/secondary) system. With a Type II system RPM cannot be reduced below manual speed settings so prop sync does not need to be "Off" during takeoff and landing. Type I systems MUST be off for takeoff and landings.

References 
Pilot Outlook - Propeller synchronization
Prop Sync Solutions - Aircraft Synchronizers vs Synchrophasers

Aircraft propulsion components